"Spring Harmony: Vision Factory Presents" (stylized as SPRING HARMONY ～VISION FACTORY presents～) is a compilation album composed of summer-themed songs by various Vision Factory artists. It was released at the beginning of Spring in Japan on February 13, 2008.

Track listing

References

External links
Oricon Information

2008 compilation albums
Avex Group albums
Avex Group compilation albums
J-pop compilation albums
Lead (band) albums
MAX (band) albums